Corona (from the Latin for 'crown') most commonly refers to:

 Stellar corona, the outer atmosphere of the Sun or another star
 Corona (beer), a Mexican beer
 Corona, informal term for the coronavirus SARS-CoV-2, which causes the COVID-19 disease and is responsible for the ongoing pandemic

Corona may also refer to:

Architecture 

 Corona, a part of a cornice
 The Corona, Canterbury Cathedral, the east end of Canterbury Cathedral

Businesses and brands

Food and drink 

 Corona (beer), a Mexican beer brand
 Corona (confectioner), Egypt
 Corona (restaurant), in the Netherlands
 Corona (soft drink), a former brand

Technology 

 Corona (software), a mobile app creation tool
 Corona Data Systems, 1980s microcomputer supplier
 Corona Labs Inc., an American software company
 Corona Typewriter Company, merged into Smith Corona in 1926
 Corona, a version of Microsoft's Xbox 360
 Chaos Corona, rendering software

Entertainment, arts and media

Fictional entities 

 Corona (fictional world), in R. A. Salvatore's DemonWars novels
 Corona, a character in the game Doraemon: Nobita to Mittsu no Seireiseki
 Corona, a character in the Spider Riders novels
 Corona, a fictional kingdom in the animated film Tangled
 Corona Mountain, the last level in Super Mario Sunshine

Film 

 Corona (film), a 2020 Canadian thriller drama film
 La Corona (film), a 2008 American short film
 Corona Zombies, a 2020 American comedy horror film
 1-2-3 Corona, a 1948 East German film

Games 

 Corona (solitaire), a card game

Literature 

 Crown of sonnets, a type of sonnet sequence
 Corona (novel), a Star Trek novel by Greg Bear
 "Corona", a poem by Paul Celan
 "Corona", a short story by Samuel R. Delany

Music 

 Corona (band), an Italian music group
 Corona, people at a cantus (Dutch drinking and singing party)
 The Coronas, an Irish rock band
 "Corona" (song), by The Minutemen
 Corona (Takemitsu), by Japanese composer Toru Takemitsu
 Corona, the circle of clergy or singers who surround the altar, and origin of the term choir
 La corona (Gluck), an opera
 Corona Capital,  music festival

People 

 Corona (surname) (including a list of people with the name)
 Saint Corona, 2nd-century Christian saint
 Corona (footballer) (born 1981), Spanish footballer
 Corona Rintawan (born 1975), Indonesian physician
 Corona Schröter (1751–1802), German musician, singer and composer

Places

United States 

 Corona, Alabama, an unincorporated community
 Corona, California, a city
 Corona, Minnesota, an unincorporated community
 Corona, Missouri, an unincorporated community
 Corona, New Mexico, a village
 Corona, Queens, New York City, New York, a neighborhood
 Corona, South Dakota, a town
 Corona, Tennessee, an unincorporated community

Elsewhere 

 Corona Lodge, Berea, Gauteng, South Africa
 Corona Station (pastoral lease), New South Wales, Australia
 Corona Theatre School, in London, England
 Estadio Corona, a stadium in Mexico
 La Corona, an ancient Mayan city in Guatemala
 Brașov, Romania (Medieval Latin name Corona), a city
 Corona, Cuba, a hamlet

Science

Astronomy and space 
 Stellar corona, the outer atmosphere of a star
 Corona Borealis, the Northern Crown constellation
 Corona Australis, the Southern Crown constellation
 Corona (optical phenomenon), coloured rings around Sun or Moon
 Corona (planetary geology)
 CORONA (rocket), a Russian prototype
 CORONA (satellite), a 1959–1972 US satellite series

Biology 

 Coronavirus, a group of RNA viruses
 Severe acute respiratory syndrome coronavirus 2 (SARS-CoV-2), a coronavirus responsible for the 2019–present pandemic
 Coronavirus disease 2019 (COVID-19), the disease caused by the virus
 COVID-19 pandemic, the ongoing global pandemic
 Corona (gastropod), a genus of large tropical land snails
 Corona (perianth), in the corolla of some flowering plants
 Corona,  anterior lobes of a rotifer
 Corona of glans penis
 Corona ciliaris, a part of the human eye

Mathematics 

 Corona theorem (or conjecture) in complex analysis
 Corona algebra (or corona) of a C*-algebra
 Corona graph product, a kind of binary operation on two graphs
 Corona set (or corona), of a topological space

Physics 

 Corona (fluid dynamics), the last phase of a drop's impact on a liquid surface
 Corona discharge or corona effect, an electrical discharge around a conductor
 Corona poling, treatment of a material to enhance electro-optic properties

Transportation

Automobiles 

 Toyota Corona, a 1957–2001 Japanese compact car

Rail 

 Corona station (Edmonton), a light rail station in Edmonton, Alberta, Canada
 Corona station (LIRR), a former railroad station in New York City, New York, US
 IRT Flushing Line, a New York City Subway line, formerly called the Corona Line

Watercraft 

 French frigate Corona (1807)
 MS Svea Corona, a former car–passenger ferry
 SS Corona, a Finnish cargo ship 1922−1960
 USS Corona (SP-813), a yacht used by the US Navy in WWI

Other uses 

 Corona (typeface), a font
 Operation Corona, a British WWII operation
 Corona, a type of cigar

See also 

 Carona (disambiguation)
 Coroana (disambiguation)
 Corona Line (disambiguation)
 Korona (disambiguation)
 Koruna (disambiguation)
 Krona (disambiguation)
 Crown (disambiguation)